"Timmy the Turtle" is a song by the American punk rock band NOFX. It was recorded during the sessions for So Long and Thanks for All the Shoes. Duncan from Snuff sings the lead vocal on the song. This record was limited to 9,499 copies on green vinyl. As seen in the inlay of the "45 or 46 songs ..", this song is about Tim who counted the people at the entrance on the NOFX concerts over the years, so the unfair promoters can't go rip off the band.

Track listing
Side A
"Timmy the Turtle" (1:39)

Side B
"The Plan" (2:59)

References

NOFX EPs
1999 EPs
Fat Wreck Chords EPs